A Man's Fight is a lost 1919 American silent drama film directed by Thomas N. Heffron and starring Dustin Farnum and Lois Wilson.

Plot
As described in a film magazine, wealthy clubman Roger Carr (Farnum) assumes responsibility for a murder for which he believes his sister is guilty. He serves his sentence and returns home only to find that his father will not accept him back as he has besmirched the family name. His sister has entered a convent. He goes west and engages in his profession, mining engineer, soon becoming the leader of the independent miner operators against trust persecution. Here he meets and learns to love a western girl that works as his stenographer. When success is about to crown his efforts, his antagonists discover his prison record and use it against him. Then his sister appears with a signed confession of a butler, formerly in their employ, who told the truth of the murder on his dying bed. This results in a happy ending.

Cast
 Dustin Farnum as Roger Carr
 Dorothy Wallace as Ethel Carr
 J. Barney Sherry as David Carr
 Wedgwood Nowell as Norman Evans
 Harry von Meter as Jarvis
 Lois Wilson as Mary Tompkins
 Miles McCarthy as Oliver Dale
 Betty Bouton as Avis Dale
 Dick La Reno as Logan
 Aggie Herring as Mrs. Murphy
 Bert Appling as Callahan

References

External links

 
 
 Scene from the film (University of Wasthington, Sayre Collection)

1919 films
American silent feature films
Lost American films
1919 drama films
Silent American drama films
American black-and-white films
Films directed by Thomas N. Heffron
1919 lost films
Lost drama films
1910s American films
1910s English-language films